Khokhra River is a river in western India in Gujarat whose origin is Near Jaru. Its basin has a maximum length of 40 km. The total catchment area of the basin is 93 km2.

References

Rivers of Gujarat
Rivers of India